Rogelio Manuel Diaz Brown Ramsburgh (born 26 January 1980) is a Mexican politician from the Institutional Revolutionary Party. From 2009 to 2012 he served as Deputy of the LXI Legislature of the Mexican Congress representing Sonora. He served as municipal president of Cajeme from 2012 to 2015.

References

1980 births
Living people
People from Ciudad Obregón
Politicians from Sonora
Institutional Revolutionary Party politicians
21st-century Mexican politicians
Mexican people of Irish descent
Members of the Congress of Sonora
Municipal presidents in Sonora
Deputies of the LXI Legislature of Mexico
Members of the Chamber of Deputies (Mexico) for Sonora